No Woman, No Cry is a 2010 documentary film about maternal death, directed by Christy Turlington. The film premiered at the 2010 Tribeca Film Festival.

References

External links
 

2010 films
American documentary films
Maternal death
Documentary films about health care
Documentary films about women
2010s English-language films
2010s American films